The 1879 Scottish Cup Final was the sixth final of the Scottish Cup and the final of the 1878–79 Scottish Cup, the most prestigious knockout football competition in Scotland. The match was played at Hampden Park in Crosshill (today part of Glasgow) on 19 April 1879 and was watched by a crowd of 6,000 spectators. The final was contested by the defending champions Vale of Leven and Rangers who had never won the cup.

The match finished 1–1 and would have been replayed; however, Rangers objected to a disallowed goal in the original match and refused to play the replay and the cup was awarded to Vale of Leven.

Background
Two-time defending champions Vale of Leven reached the final for the third time and had lifted the trophy in both their previous appearances in 1876 and 1877. A third triumph would equal both Queen's Park's records at the time for most Scottish Cup wins and most consecutive Scottish Cup wins.

The match marked the third time Vale of Leven and Rangers would contest a Scottish Cup tie. Vale won both previous meetings but had required replays to do so, although they would win the trophy on both occasions. They defeated Rangers 3–2 after a second replay in the 1877 final and advanced from a fourth round replay with a 5–0 win in 1877–78.

Route to the final

Both teams progressed through six previous rounds to reach the final.

Vale of Leven

Rangers

Match details

Original

Replay

References

External links
London Hearts Scottish Football Reports 19 April 1879
Scottish Football Archive 1878–79

Scottish Cup Finals
Scottish Cup Final 1879
Scottish Cup Final 1879
Cup
19th century in Glasgow
April 1879 sports events